Astou Traoré (born 30 April 1981) is a Senegalese women's basketball player. She is also a regular on the Senegalese women's national basketball team. She signed for Spanish team Uni Girona CB. She played previously with Rivas Futura of the Spanish Liga Femenina de Baloncesto.

External links
Profile at eurobasket.com

1981 births
Living people
Senegalese women's basketball players
Forwards (basketball)
Basketball players at the 2016 Summer Olympics
Olympic basketball players of Senegal
Senegalese expatriate basketball people in France
Senegalese expatriate basketball people in Spain
African Games gold medalists for Senegal
African Games medalists in basketball
Senegalese expatriate basketball people in Belgium
Senegalese expatriate basketball people in Ecuador
Senegalese expatriate basketball people in Turkey
Competitors at the 2007 All-Africa Games
People from M'Bour